Dimension Pictures was an American film studio founded in 1971, which primarily released exploitation and horror films. The studio went defunct in 1981, after which many of its films were acquired by 21st Century Film Corporation.

History
Dimension was founded by Lawrence Woolner, an exhibitor who had made a number of films, including several with Roger Corman. He hired the husband and wife team of Stephanie Rothman and Charles S. Swartz to run the filmmaking division. Rothman and Swartz left in 1975 but the company continued until about 1981. After the company's bankruptcy, a majority of the films were acquired by 21st Century Film Corporation.

Select filmography

The Twilight People (1972)
The Sin of Adam & Eve (1972)
Sweet Sugar (1972)
Group Marriage (1973)
The Doberman Gang (1973)
The Devil's Wedding Night (1973)
The Three Dimensions of Greta 3-D (1973)
Invasion of the Bee Girls (1973)
Terminal Island (1973)
The Daring Dobermans (1973)
Beyond Atlantis (1973)
'Gator Bait (1973)
The Single Girls (1973)
A Place Without Parents (1974)
Tough (1974)
The Working Girls (1974)
Love in 3-D (1974)
Scum of the Earth (1974)
Boss Nigger (1975)
Brother, Can You Spare a Dime? (1975)
Not Now Darling (1975)
Dr. Minx (1975)
Dolemite (1975)
Lady Cocoa (1975)
Dr. Black, Mr. Hyde (1976)
Dixie Dynamite (1976)
Ebony, Ivory & Jade (1976)
The Human Tornado (1976)
Black Shampoo (1976)
The Bad Bunch (1976)
The Muthers (1976)
Drive-In Massacre (1976)
Exit the Dragon, Enter the Tiger (1976)
Lover Doll (1976)
Super Dude (1976)
Return to Boggy Creek (1977)
Joey (1977)
Legend of the Wolf Woman (1977)
Ruby (1977)
Kingdom of the Spiders (1977)
Cheering Section (1977)
Tomcats (1977)
Bad Georgia Road (1977)
The Great Smokey Roadblock (1977)
Out of the Darkness (1978)
The Redeemer (1978)
Hi-Riders (1978)
Smooth Velvet, Raw Silk (1978)
Swap Meet (1979)
The Great American Girl Robbery (1979)
Satan's Cheerleaders (1979)
The Greatest Battle (1979)
Screams of a Winter Night (1979)
Stone Cold Dead (1980)
Dinner for Adele (1980)

References

Sources

Defunct film and television production companies of the United States
Entertainment companies based in California
American companies established in 1970
Entertainment companies established in 1970
Entertainment companies disestablished in 1981
Mass media companies established in 1970
Mass media companies disestablished in 1981
1970 establishments in California
1981 disestablishments in California